Lincoln is the central settlement and a census-designated place (CDP) in the town of Lincoln, Addison County, Vermont, United States. It was first listed as a CDP prior to the 2020 census.

It is in the eastern part of Addison County, at the center of the town of Lincoln, in the valley of the New Haven River, a west-flowing tributary of Otter Creek and part of the Lake Champlain watershed. Lincoln Gap Road leaves from the southeast corner of the CDP and leads east over the crest of the Green Mountains at Lincoln Gap  to the center of Warren.

References 

Populated places in Addison County, Vermont
Census-designated places in Addison County, Vermont
Census-designated places in Vermont